The Talent 2 is a multiple unit railcar manufactured by Bombardier Transportation. The train began production in 2008 and first entered service with Deutsche Bahn in 2011.

Despite having the same name as the original Talent, designed by Waggonfabrik Talbot and later acquired by Bombardier, for the most part it does not share technical details with that train, except for the rounded sides and doorways. The crash-optimized design of the cab ends have led to the units acquiring the nickname "Hamsterbacke" (Hamster Cheeks). The Talent 3 is the successor of the Talent 2.

Operations

Notes and references

Bombardier Transportation multiple units
Talent
Articulated passenger trains
15 kV AC multiple units